Worldwide Plaza may refer to:
One Worldwide Plaza, a building in the complex Worldwide Plaza, Hell's Kitchen, New York City
A shopping center in World-Wide House, Hong Kong